Jeanne Richard (born 13 April 2002) is a French olympic biathlete. She participated at the 2020 Winter Youth Olympics in the biathlon competition, being awarded the silver medal in the girls' individual. Richard also participated in the single mixed relay event, winning the gold medal with her teammate Mathieu Garcia. 

Richard participated at the Biathlon Junior World Championships 2021, being awarded the gold medal in the youth women's 10 km individual event. She also participated in the youth women's 3 × 6 km relay event, being awarded the gold medal with her teammates, Fany Bertrand and Maya Cloetens. Richard participated at the Biathlon Junior World Championships 2022 in the junior women's 4 × 6 km relay event, being awarded the bronze medal with her teammates Camille Coupé, Noémie Remonnay and Océane Michelon.
In shooting, Jeanne Richard shoulder left.

References

External links 

2002 births
Living people
Place of birth missing (living people)
French female biathletes
Biathletes at the 2020 Winter Youth Olympics
Medalists at the 2020 Winter Youth Olympics
Youth Olympic gold medalists for France
21st-century French women